The grapheme Ć (minuscule: ć), formed from C with the addition of an acute accent, is used in various languages. It usually denotes , the voiceless alveolo-palatal affricate, including in phonetic transcription. Its Unicode codepoints are U+0106 for Ć and U+0107 for ć.

The symbol originated in the Polish alphabet (where, in its modern usage, it appears most often at the ends of words) and was adopted by Croatian linguist Ljudevit Gaj into Serbo-Croatian in the 19th century. It is the fifth letter of the Polish, Sorbian, and the Latin alphabet of Serbo-Croatian language, as well as its slight variant, the Montenegrin Latin alphabet. It is fourth in the Belarusian Łacinka alphabet and Ukrainian Latynka alphabet.

It is also adopted by Wymysorys, a West-Germanic language spoken in Poland. It is the fifth letter of the Wymysorys alphabet.

In Slovene, it occurs only in names and surnames, mainly from Serbo-Croatian (e.g. Handanović), and denotes the same sound as Č, i.e. the voiceless palato-alveolar affricate.

The Serbian Cyrillic alphabet equivalent is Ћ (23rd letter). Macedonian uses Ќ as a partial equivalent (24th letter). Other languages which use the Cyrillic alphabet usually represent this sound by the character combination ЧЬ, however it is represented by Ч in Russian.

The letter is also used in unofficial Belarusian Łacinka and in unofficial Ukrainian Latynka where it represents the palatalized alveolar affricate .

In Ladin it represents [tʃ] when preceded by [ʃ] (e.g. desćiarié, [deʃtʃariˈe]).

Computing code

See also
 Acute accent
 Č, Ś
 List of Latin digraphs

References

Latin letters with diacritics
Phonetic transcription symbols
Polish letters with diacritics
Serbo-Croatian language